Venezuela competed in the 2008 Summer Olympics which was held in Beijing, People's Republic of China from August 8 to August 24, 2008.

Medalists

Archery

Athletics

Key
 Note – Ranks given for track events are within the athlete's heat only
 Q = Qualified for the next round
 q = Qualified for the next round as a fastest loser or, in field events, by position without achieving the qualifying target
 NR = National record
 N/A = Round not applicable for the event
 Bye = Athlete not required to compete in round

Men

Women

Boxing

Venezuela qualified six boxers for the Olympic boxing tournament. Manzanilla and Blanco were the first to qualify, earning spots at the 2007 World Championships. Bermúdez, Sánchez, and González qualified at the first American qualifying tournament. Payares was the last to qualify, doing so at the second qualifier.

The team's record in Beijing was 3–6, with only Héctor Manzanilla winning more than one bout. Both Manzanilla and Alfonso Blanco made the quarterfinals, but neither won their bout.

Canoeing

Sprint
Both Venezuelan boats progressed to the semifinals, but finished last and did not advance to the final.

Qualification Legend: QS = Qualify to semi-final; QF = Qualify directly to final

Cycling

Road
The top finish from a Venezuelan road racer was the 30th place from Jackson Rodríguez in the men's race. Neither woman finished within ten minutes of the leader.

BMX
Venezuela sent former cruiser (22") world champion Jonathan Suárez to compete in BMX. He finished 8th in seeding, but finished 8th in the first of three quarterfinal races and could not advance.

Diving

Ramón Fumadó was in position to qualify for the semifinals after the first two dives, but fell behind and finished ten points short.

Men

Equestrian

Show jumping

Fencing

Venezuela sent a seven-person fencing team to Beijing, but they combined to win just two matches. Considering the team included the #1 ranked men's épée fencer, Silvio Fernández, this was somewhat of a disappointment. Fernandez won his opening match, but then lost to a Hungarian opponent in the second round. The other win came from the men's épée team, who lost their quarterfinal, but won a placement match against Korea before ending up in 6th place overall.

Men

Women

Gymnastics

Artistic
Venezuela sent two gymnasts to Beijing, with José Luis Fuentes managing to make the final in both the men's all-around and pommel horse events. Fuentes finished last of the finalists in the pommel horse final and 22nd of 24 in the all-around final. Jessica López did not advance to a final.

Men

Women

Judo

Seven judokas represented Venezuela in Beijing, putting up an overall record of 6–10. None advanced beyond the quarterfinals in the main draw, and only Flor Velázquez progressed to the repechage semifinals, but lost to a Kazakhstani opponent, falling one bout short of a chance at a medal.

Men

Women

Rowing

Venezuela had qualified 1 boat in rowing.

Men

Qualification Legend: FA=Final A (medal); FB=Final B (non-medal); FC=Final C (non-medal); FD=Final D (non-medal); FE=Final E (non-medal); FF=Final F (non-medal); SA/B=Semifinals A/B; SC/D=Semifinals C/D; SE/F=Semifinals E/F; QF=Quarterfinals; R=Repechage

Sailing

None of the three Venezuelan boats participating in Olympic sailing in Beijing qualified for a medal race, with the top finish being 26th from Johnny Bilbao in the Finn class.

Men

Open

M = Medal race; EL = Eliminated – did not advance into the medal race; CAN = Race cancelled;

Shooting

Women

Softball

The Venezuelan women's softball team qualified for the Olympics by winning the Pan-American qualifying tournament at home Valencia. At the Olympics, they initially struggled, losing their first three games by a combined score of 21–1, but then won two straight games without conceding a run, leaving them at 2-3 and in the hunt for a medal round place. However, they lost two difficult matches against eventual medal winners to close out the round robin, and fell one loss short of a medal round spot.

Team roster
Denisse Fuenmayor
Geraldine Puertas
Jineth Pimentel
Johana Gómez
María Soto
Marianella Castellanos
Mayles Rodríguez
Rubilena Rojas
Yaciey Sojo
Yurubi Alicart
Yusmary Pérez
Zuleyma Cirimele
Maribel Riera
Mariangee Bogado
Bheiglys Mujica

Results

Swimming

Venezuela sent a thirteen-person swimming team to compete in eighteen events in Beijing. In the pool, only two progressed to a semifinal, and none made a final. The best finishes for the team came in the two open water events, as Erwin Maldonado finished 10th in the men's race, and Andreina Pinto finished 9th in the women's race.

Men

Qualifiers for the latter rounds of all events are decided on a time only basis, therefore positions shown are overall results versus competitors in all heats.

Women

Qualifiers for the latter rounds of all events are decided on a time only basis, therefore positions shown are overall results versus competitors in all heats.

Table tennis

Fabiola Ramos won her preliminary round match, but lost to a North Korean opponent in the first round.

Taekwondo

Venezuela won their first Olympic medal in Taekwondo in Athens, and though Adriana Carmona, who won that medal, lost her first round match in Beijing, Venezuela was able to win another medal in 2008. Dalia Contreras won her first two matches to make the semifinals in the women's under 49 kg division, where she lost a tied match on a judges decision. Still, her semifinals appearance allowed her to progress directly to the bronze medal match, where she beat a Kenyan opponent to claim Venezuela's only medal of the 2008 Games. Overall, the four person Taekwondo team went 4-4, with three of the four wins from Contreras.

Tennis

Milagros Sequera was trailing by a set and a game when she retired from her first round match.

Volleyball

Indoor
Both Venezuelan volleyball teams won the South American Qualification tournament to earn their Olympic berths, but were less successful in Beijing. Between them, the two teams won just one out of ten matches, with the men's team beating Japan in straight sets. The men's team also forced a fifth set against both the American and Chinese teams, eventually finishing fifth in their group, while the women's team won only a single set and finished last in their group. The final ranking of the men's team was tied for 9th place, while that of the women's team was tied for 11th place.

Men's tournament

Roster

Group play

All times are China Standard Time (UTC+8).

Women's tournament

Roster

Group play

All times are China Standard Time (UTC+8).

Weightlifting

The top finish from a Venezuelan lifter in Beijing was a 9th from Judith Chacon in the 53 kg division, but this was last placed finish in a division with few entrants. The next best finish came from Israel José Rubio in the men's 69 kg division, where he finished 13th. Three of the seven Venezuelan lifters did not complete a valid lift in one of the portions of the competition, and thus did not finish with a legal total.

Men

Women

Wrestling

The three Venezuelan wrestlers combined for a record of 0–4, with Luis Vivénez qualifying for the repechage, but losing his match to a Cuban athlete.

Key
  – Victory by Fall.
  – Decision by Points – the loser with technical points.
  – Decision by Points – the loser without technical points.

Men's freestyle

Women's freestyle

See also
 Venezuela at the 2007 Pan American Games
 Venezuela at the 2010 Central American and Caribbean Games

References
List of qualified athletes (Spanish)

Nations at the 2008 Summer Olympics
2008
Summer Olympics